Pratham (also called Olle Huduga Pratham) is an Indian actor and the winner of Kannada reality show Bigg Boss Kannada (season 4) (2016–17).

Personal life
Pratham was born on February 24 to Malle Gowda, a government employee, and Lakshmi, a high-school teacher in Halagapura of Kollegal taluk, Karnataka, India. He studied in Mysuru and T. Narsipura and grew up with his maternal grandparents.

Filmography

Philanthropy
Pratham donated the prize money (₹50 lakh) of winning the reality show, to physically-challenged girls for their wedding. In May 2019, Pratham lent his support to a college student for further studies.

External links
On Facebook
On Instagram

References

Living people
Reality show winners
Participants in Indian reality television series
Big Brother (franchise) winners
Bigg Boss Kannada contestants
Year of birth missing (living people)